Girdharpur is a village in Bareilly district of the Indian state of Uttar Pradesh. It is 3 kilometers away from State Highway 37 and lies within the coordinates 28°42'51.60"N & 79°27'46"E.

Geography 

Girdharpur is the largest village by population in the Baheri (Vidhan Sabha constituency) and Bareilly district with a total population of 7,399 people and 1,616 households 

It is situated 8 kilometers away from sub-district headquarter Baheri and 42 kilometers away from district headquarter Bareilly, Girdharpur lies within the coordinates 28°42'51.60"N & 79°27'46"E  and has an area of 243.27 hectares 
Broad up gramin bank mini branch in girdharpur near kabristan wali masjid

Girdharpur is well irrigated by canals and even blessed by a perennial river called Girdharpur River which flows throughout the year and irrigates the major portion of agricultural lands in the village. Girdharpur also have two ponds which are a source of fish.

Connectivity 
Girdharpur have no state run public transport service, people use privately run Tanga (carriage) and Three-wheelers for transport.

Buses run by School Authorities are the common mode of travel by Students of the town with around 6 to 7 buses picking and dropping students studying in the schools located most commonly in nearby Baheri town.

Demographics

Population 
As per provisional reports of Census India, population of Girdharpur in 2011 was 7,399; Total number of houses are 1,616 with 3,858 males and 3,541 females. Children below the age of 6 years are numbered 1,254. There are 243 Schedule Caste people in Girdharpur.

Literacy 
According to 2011 census, Girdharpur has literacy rate of 61.04% which is below India's National literacy rate of 74.04% and also below the State Uttar Pradesh's literacy rate of 67.68%.

Economy 
Girdharpur has diverse Commerce like Petroleum retail, Rice industries, Garment Industry, Handicraft etc., but Agriculture is the main bread source for this small economy with people growing a variety of products like Wheat, Rice, Sugarcane, Spice and Vegetables.

Animal husbandry is also quite common since a decade, as a lot of folks are indulge in Poultry farming these days.

Girdharpur is self-reliant for its basic food requirements.

Climate
Girdharpur experiences winter from November to February with pleasant windy days, clear skies and cool nights which makes it the most enjoyable time of the year. The day temperature hovers around 16 °C which drops to 8 °C at night for most of December and January, often dropping to 4 °C. On particular cold days, wind may appear to be very chilly due to the dryness of air. Rain is very expected in even in February.

References

Cities and towns in Bareilly district